Thomas de Berkeley, 5th Baron Berkeley (5 January 1352/53 – 13 July 1417), The Magnificent, of Berkeley Castle and of Wotton-under-Edge in Gloucestershire, was an English peer and an admiral. His epithet, and that of each previous and subsequent head of his family, was coined by John Smyth of Nibley (d.1641), steward of the Berkeley estates, the biographer of the family and author of "Lives of the Berkeleys".

Origins
He was born at Berkeley Castle in Gloucestershire, the son and heir of Maurice de Berkeley, 4th Baron Berkeley by his wife Elizabeth le Despencer.

Transfers estate to trustees
In 1417 he enfeoffed at Berkeley Castle, shortly before his death, several feoffees to hold all his lands in trust, due to the fact he had no male children as his heirs and that the course of succession then seemed unclear. The catalogue entry made by the British Museum librarian Isaac Jeaves for charter number 581 preserved in the muniments at Berkeley Castle records: 
"Feoffment by Thomas, Lord Berkeley, Knt, to Walter Poole, Gilbert Denys Knts, Thomas Knolles, citizen of London, Thomas Rugge, John Grevell, Robert Greyndour and Thomas Sergeant, esquires, of all the lands, reversions, and tenants' services in Berkeley, Wotton, Gloucester, South Cerney, Cerneyeswike, Aure, Arlingham, and Horton, and in Berkeley and Bledislow Hundreds; in the City of London; in Portbury, Portishead, Weston, Bedminster, and in Bedminster and Portbury Hundreds, co. Somerset, and in Sharnecote and Chicklade, co. Wiltshire, together with the advowsons of St. Andrew's Church in Baynard's Castle, London, the advowsons of Chicklade, Portishead, and Walton, and the patronage and advowson of St. Mary's Abbey of Kingswood. Witnesses: Thomas FitzNicoll, John Pauncefoot, Knights; Robert Poyntz, Edmund Bassett, Thomas Kendale. Datum ad Berkeley, Thursday, Feast of the Nativity of St. John the Baptist (24 June) 5 Hen. V. (1417) Withseal,broken)"

The great City of London townhouse of the Berkeleys, known as "Berkeley's Inn", was at Puddle Dock by Baynard's Castle, close to the Blackfriars Monastery.  Thomas FitzNicholl, one of the witnesses, was many times MP for Gloucestershire, including in 1395 when he served jointly with Gilbert Denys. Nigel Saul states that such feoffees were likely to have been members of Lord Berkeley's retinue. These were very significant positions of trust granted to his feoffees as Berkeley died leaving only a daughter and the succession to the vast Berkeley lands, including the castle itself, became a matter of much dispute amongst his possible heirs resulting in a series of feuds which led in 1470 to the last private battle fought on English soil at the Battle of Nibley Green, between Lord William Berkeley and Viscount Lisle, and there followed the longest dispute in English legal history, which did not end until 1609.

Marriage

In 1367 Thomas married Margaret de Lisle, 3rd Baroness Lisle (1360–1392), daughter of Warine de Lisle, 2nd Baron Lisle (d.1382) and Margaret Pipard. By his wife he had no male progeny, only a daughter and sole heiress:
 Elizabeth de Lisle (born ca.1386 – 28 December 1422), suo jure Baroness Lisle, who married Richard de Beauchamp, 13th Earl of Warwick (1381–1459).

Death and burial
He died on 13 July 1417 and was buried in the Church of St Mary the Virgin church within his manor of Wotton-under-Edge. His very large chest tomb with Monumental brass on top survives in that church. The brass shows him lying beside his wife, and is very similar to that of his contemporary Sir Maurice Russell (d.1416) at Dyrham, who was the father-in-law of Gilbert Denys, one of Berkeley's feoffees.

Succession
Having died without male progeny the succession to the vast Berkeley estates became disputed, and eventually resulted in the 
Battle of Nibley Green (1469/70), the last battle fought in England entirely between the private armies of feudal magnates, fought near Berkeley Castle on 20 March 1469/70 between the troops of Thomas Talbot, 2nd Viscount Lisle and William Berkeley, 2nd Baron Berkeley, later 1st Marquess of Berkeley. Lisle and William Berkeley had long been engaged in a dispute over the inheritance of Berkeley Castle and the other Berkeley lands, as Lisle being heir-general to Thomas de Berkeley, 5th Baron Berkeley and was the Berkeley heir male. Lisle impetuously challenged Berkeley to a battle, and the latter agreed, the battle to be fought the next day at Nibley Green. Lisle was defeated.

Gallery

Ancestors

Sources
Richardson, Douglas, Kimball G. Everingham, and David Faris. Plantagenet Ancestry: A Study in Colonial and Medieval Families. Royal ancestry series. (p. 99) Baltimore, Md: Genealogical Pub. Co, 2004. Retrieved 20 April 2008
thepeerage.com. Retrieved 20 April 2008

References

1350s births
1417 deaths
15th-century English Navy personnel
5
English admirals
People from Berkeley, Gloucestershire
Thomas
Male Shakespearean characters